An earthquake occurred at 2:13 p.m. on Friday, July 19, 2019, and affected millions of many in the middle of the day. Several seismological institutes determined  a magnitude of about 5.3 and the epicentral region appeared to be south of Mt Parnitha, ~20 km NW of the Athens metropolitan area. Nearly 20 years before, on the 7th September 1999, Athens was struck by a 6.0 magnitude earthquake.

The earthquake engendered power cuts and communication problems for at least two hours around Athens and the emergency responders reported receiving calls about people being trapped in elevators. Three people were injured.

Setting 
Greece is located in the South-East of Europe and is characterized by a complex tectonic structure, with major mountain ranges and a high seismic activity, concentrated in the Hellenic Arc.

There is historical evidence of several earthquakes located at distances between 30 and 70 km outside the city of Athens.

Macroseismicity and vulnerability 
To determine the perceived intensity of the 2019 earthquake, the Macroseismic Field Investigation Team of the Department of Geology and Geoenvironment of the University of Athens (NKUA), surveyed citizens from the suburbs of Athens and several towns near the epicentre within a few hours after the earthquake and in the following week. They could gather 63 questionnaire which reported the felt shaking based on the EMS-98 intensity scale and 48 damage photos.

Data from the EMSC
The EMSC is among the international seismological institutes that use citizens' perceived shaking to determine an estimate of the felt intensity of the earthquake. The EMSC surveys people who just experienced an earthquake through a set of cartoons depicting the 12 levels of the EMS-98 intensity scale. This procedure is very fast and is essential to rapid situational awareness.

In the case of the 2019 Athens earthquake, 76% of felt reports received by the EMSC were gathered within the first hour following the earthquake onset, allowing for a quasi real-time information. Most responses came from Attica.

See also
List of earthquakes in 2019
List of earthquakes in Greece
1999 Athens earthquake

References

External links

Earthquakes in Greece
2019 in Greece
July 2019 events in Europe
History of Athens
2019 earthquakes
2019 disasters in Greece